Piraeus, Athens and Peloponnese Railways or SPAP ( "Siderodromi Pireos Athinon Peloponisou" or Σ.Π.Α.Π. The company was nationalized in 1954 and absorbed by the Hellenic State Railways in 1962.

The name "Spap" originates from the Greek initials of the railway company.

History

The first line section between Piraeus, Athens and Elefsis was completed in 1884. The line reached Corinth in 1885 and Patras in 1887. In the meantime, an eastern branch from Corinth reached Argos and Nafplion in 1886. The western branch reached Pyrgos and finally Kyparissia in 1902. SPAP also acquired the line between Myloi (near Argos) and Kalamata via Tripoli, from the bankrupt Southern Greece Railways (Sidirodromoi Mesimbrinis Ellados). The two routes to Kalamata, via Patras and via Tripoli, merged at Zevgolatio.

Short branches were also constructed to serve important towns: Argos-Nafplion, Lefktro-Megalopolis, Kavasila-Vartholomio-Kyllini, Vartholomio-Kyllini Spa (Loutra), Pyrgos to Ancient Olympia, Asprochoma-Messini and, much later (1954), Isthmos-Loutraki. Diakofto Kalavrita Railway was also constructed by SPAP, but at a smaller gauge.

The line from Piraeus to Corinth was 99 km, from Corinth to Kalamata via Tripoli 236 km and from Corinth to Zevgolatio via Patras and Pyrgos 347 km. The total length of the system with the branch lines was 731 km.

In 1929 SPAP acquired the Heraklion-Lavrion section of Athens-Lavrion Railway, formerly operated by Attica Railways, and constructed a link from Kato Liossia (today Agioi Anargyroi) to Heraklion, to connect the Lavrion line to its network (1931). Passenger services on this branch were suspended in 1957 and it was cut off from the rest of the network in 1962, due to the construction of the Athens-Thessaloniki highway.

During the Axis occupation of Greece in World War 2, and especially during the withdrawal of German troops in 1944, the network and the rolling stock suffered extensive damages both by the German army and by Greek resistance groups. Repair of SPAP assets was time consuming and expensive. Damaged rolling stock was mainly repaired at Piraeus Engine Sheds. Normal levels of service resumed at about 1948 with the exception of the destroyed bridge of Achladokampos (between Argos and Tripoli), which was rebuilt by OSE in 1974.

In 1951 SPAP absorbed the small Pyrgos-Katakolo Railway. In 1953 SPAP absorbed Northwestern Greece Railways (SDBE), which operated a metre gauge line from Kryoneri to Messolongi and Agrinion.

In 1920 SPAP was briefly nationalized as part of the Hellenic State Railways but it became an independent company again two years later. Due to high debts, SPAP came under government control in 1939-1940 and was formally nationalized again in 1954. In 1962 the company was absorbed by the Hellenic State Railways.

Suspension
The economic crisis in Greece led to the suspension of all passenger and freight services on the metre gauge railway system in the Peloponnese in 2011.

Current situation
It is unlikely services will ever resume as a publicly run system, although some privately-chartered services occasionally run.  A short section through the port city of Patras remains open as a suburban railway.

Partial reopening

As part of the P.A.Th.E./P. project, the former section of track between Athens and Kiato has been rebuilt to standard gauge and electrified. The Athens Airport–Patras railway, opened in 2007 until Kiato, is served by the Athens Suburban Railway. An extension from Patras to Kalamata via Pyrgos is also planned.

It was announced in July 2020 that the sections from Patras to Pirgos and Corinth- Kalamata and the branch to Napfion will reopen in 2021 with some sections perhaps earlier, however, Covid 19 has slowed this progress.

Rolling stock

Steam locomotives
Between 1883 and 1962 SPAP used 128 locomotives of 25 different types.

Diesel multiple units

SPAP introduced diesel railcars and multiple units early in 1937. They reduced journey times and offered good passenger facilities.

Diesel locomotives

See also

 Diakofto Kalavrita Railway
 Athens–Lavrion Railway

Notes and references

Further reading

 
 
 
 
 
 
 

Defunct railway companies of Greece
1882 establishments in Greece
Railway companies established in 1882
1962 disestablishments in Greece
Companies established in 1882
Companies disestablished in 1962
Metre gauge railways in Greece